Books published with the title Climate Change include: 

Climate Change (Ladybird Expert book), a 2017 book for adults authored by Charles, Prince of Wales and others  
Climate Change (children's book), a 2023 book published by Ladybird Books and co-authored by Charles III and others